The Crime Is Mine is a 2023 French crime comedy film directed by François Ozon starring Nadia Tereszkiewicz, Rebecca Marder, Isabelle Huppert, Fabrice Luchini, Dany Boon, and André Dussollier. Set in the 1930s, the film follows an actress who gains notoriety after getting acquitted of murder for self-defense. It is a loose adaptation of the 1934 play Mon crime by Georges Berr and Louis Verneuil, which has been adapted into two American films, True Confession (1937) and Cross My Heart (1946).

Cast
 Nadia Tereszkiewicz as Madeleine Verdier
 Rebecca Marder as Pauline Mauléon
 Isabelle Huppert as Odette Chaumette
 Fabrice Luchini as Richter Gustave Rabusset
 Dany Boon as Palmarède
 André Dussollier as M. Bonnard
 
 Régis Laspalès
 Olivier Broche
 Félix Lefebvre
 Michel Fau
 Daniel Prévost
 Evelyne Buyle
 Myriam Boyer
 Franck de Lapersonne

Production
Ozon conceived of the film during the COVID-19 lockdowns. He described it as being "ultimately about the triumph of sorority". He said, "it ends with a play in the tradition of Jean Renoir. It's also a playful reference to The Last Metro by François Truffaut". Huppert's character was based on the actress Sarah Bernhardt. Other influcences included "American screwball comedies from the 1930s", particularly films by Ernst Lubitsch and Frank Capra, as well as "the Paris of the 1930s viewed by the Americans, as in the film Victor/Victoria by Blake Edwards".

Filming took place from April to June 2022, in and around Paris and in Charleroi and Brussels, Belgium.

Release
The film screened for industry professionals on 10 January 2023 at Unifrance's Rendez-Vous with French Cinema showcase in Paris. It premiered as the opening film at the Festival Premiers Plans d'Angers on 21 January 2023.

References

External links
 

2020s French films
2020s French-language films
2020s crime comedy films
French crime comedy films
French courtroom films
French films based on plays
Films directed by François Ozon
Films based on works by Louis Verneuil